Shadow Blade: Reload is a platform game in which the player assumes the role of a ninja named Kuro. The game has a mobile version called Shadow Blade.

The game is still under development and features and content are planned for future updates.
The full version will have more levels, a complete story campaign, and new game modes, as well as more integration with Steam features like the workshop, leaderboards, achievements, and cloud. The game's first public release was on July 21, 2014.

Reception 
The game received a score of 66/100 on Metacritic.

References

External links 
Steam Page
Official Website
Shadow Blade Facebook Page
Official Dead Mage Website
Dead Mage on Twitter

2014 video games
Android (operating system) games
Crescent Moon Games games
IOS games
MacOS games
PlayStation 4 games
PlayStation Network games
PlayStation Vita games
Single-player video games
Video games about ninja
Video games developed in Iran
Wii U eShop games
Windows games
Xbox One games
Dead Mage games